Jennifer Susan Duck (born 31 July 1968 in Wellington, New Zealand) is a former field hockey player from New Zealand, who finished in sixth position with the women's national team, nicknamed Black Sticks, at the 2000 Summer Olympics in Sydney, Australia. Two years earlier she was a member of the side that captured the bronze medal at the 1998 Commonwealth Games in Kuala Lumpur, Malaysia.

References
 New Zealand Olympic Committee

External links

New Zealand female field hockey players
Field hockey players at the 2000 Summer Olympics
Olympic field hockey players of New Zealand
Field hockey players from Wellington City
1968 births
Living people
Commonwealth Games bronze medallists for New Zealand
Field hockey players at the 1998 Commonwealth Games
Commonwealth Games medallists in field hockey
20th-century New Zealand women
21st-century New Zealand women
Medallists at the 1998 Commonwealth Games